The Indian Journal of Dental Research is a peer-reviewed open-access medical journal published by Medknow Publications  on behalf of the Indian Society of Dental Research. It covers orodental diseases, preventive and community dentistry, oral pathology, and dentofacial orthopedics.

Abstracting and indexing 
The journal is indexed in EBSCO, EMCARE, Excerpta Medica/EMBASE, Expanded Academic ASAP, Health & Wellness Research Center, Health Reference Center Academic, MEDLINE/Index Medicus, SafetyLit, Scopus, SIIC databases, and Ulrich's Periodicals Directory.

See also
 Open access in India

External links 
 

Open access journals
Quarterly journals
English-language journals
Dentistry journals
Medknow Publications academic journals
Publications established in 2005
Academic journals associated with learned and professional societies of India